The Nestlé Children's Book Prize, and Nestlé Smarties Book Prize for a time, was a set of annual awards for British children's books that ran from 1985 to 2007. It was administered by BookTrust, an independent charity that promotes books and reading in the United Kingdom, and sponsored by Nestlé, the manufacturer of Smarties candy. It was one of the most respected and prestigious prizes for children's literature.

There were three award categories defined by audience ages 0 to 5 years, 6 to 8 years, and 9 to 11 years (introduced in 1987 after two years with no single prize). Silver and bronze runners-up in each category were introduced in 1996 and designation of one overall winner was abandoned at the same time.

Eligible books were written by UK citizens and residents and published during the preceding year (not precisely the calendar year). The shortlists were selected by a panel of adult judges, finally chaired by Julia Eccleshare, children's books editor for The Guardian. First, second, and third places were determined by British schoolchildren—at least finally, by vote of "selected school classes"

The prize was discontinued in 2008 by what was described as a "mutual" decision from BookTrust and Nestlé, with "no hostility". Explaining their reasons for this decision, BookTrust stated it had "been reviewing the organisation's priorities and how prizes and awards fit in with its strategic objectives", while Nestlé was "increasingly moving its community support towards the company strategy of nutrition, health and wellness." Additionally, they said that it was a "natural time to conclude" and that they were "confident that increased importance has been placed on children's books."

Winners
There were 65 winning books in 23 years and 72 silver or bronze runners-up in the last twelve years.

1996–2007 with silver and bronze runners up 
2007
Gold Awards
 9–11 years: Shadow Forest by Matt Haig (Bodley Head)
 6–8 years: Ottoline and the Yellow Cat by Chris Riddell (Macmillan Children's Books)
 0–5 years: When a Monster is Born by Sean Taylor and Nick Sharratt (Orchard Books)

 Silver
 9–11 years: Catcall by Linda Newbery (Orion Children's Books)
 6–8 years: Ivan the Terrible by Anne Fine (Egmont Press)
 0–5 years: Penguin by Polly Dunbar (Walker Books)
 Bronze
 9–11 years: Here Lies Arthur by Philip Reeve (Scholastic Children's Books)
 6–8 years: Little Mouse's Big Book of Fears by Emily Gravett (Macmillan Children's Books)
 0–5 years: Dexter Bexley and the Big Blue Beastie by Joel Stewart (Doubleday)

2006
Gold Awards
 9–11 years: The Diamond of Drury Lane by Julia Golding (Egmont Press)
 6–8 years: Mouse Noses on Toast by Daren King (Faber and Faber)
 0–5 years: That Rabbit Belongs to Emily Brown by Cressida Cowell and Neal Layton (Orchard Books)

 Silver
 9–11 years: The Tide Knot by Helen Dunmore (HarperCollins)
 6–8 years: Hugo Pepper by Paul Stewart and Chris Riddell (Doubleday)
 0–5 years: The Emperor of Absurdia by Chris Riddell (Macmillan)
 Bronze
 9–11 years: The Pig Who Saved the World by Paul Shipton (Puffin)
 6–8 years: The Adventures of the Dish and the Spoon by Mini Grey (Jonathan Cape)
 0–5 years: Wibbly Pig's Silly Big Bear by Mick Inkpen (Hodder)

2005
Gold Awards
 9–11 years: I, Coriander by Sally Gardner (Orion)
 6–8 years: The Whisperer by Nick Butterworth (HarperCollins)
 0–5 years: Lost and Found by Oliver Jeffers (HarperCollins)

 Silver
 9–11 years: The Scarecrow and his Servant by Philip Pullman (DoubleDay)
 6–8 years: Sad Book by Michael Rosen, illus. Quentin Blake (Walker Books)
 0–5 years: The Dancing Tiger by Malachy Doyle, illus. Steve Johnson and Lou Fancher (Simon and Schuster)
 Bronze
 9–11 years: The Whispering Road by Livi Michael (Puffin)
 6–8 years: Corby Flood by Paul Stewart and Chris Riddell (DoubleDay)
 0–5 years: Wolves by Emily Gravett (MacMillan)

2004
Gold Awards
 9–11 years: Spilled Water by Sally Grindley (Bloomsbury Publishing)
 6–8 years: Fergus Crane by Paul Stewart and Chris Riddell (Doubleday)
 0–5 years: Biscuit Bear by Mini Grey (Cape)
4Children Special Award: Fergus Crane by Paul Stewart and Chris Riddell (Doubleday) – selected by after school clubs

 Silver
 9–11 years: The Star of Kazan by Eva Ibbotson (Macmillan)
 6–8 years: Cloud Busting by Malorie Blackman (Doubleday)
 0–5 years: My Big Brother Boris by Liz Pichon (Scholastic)
 Bronze
 9–11 years: Keeper by Mal Peet (Walker)
 6–8 years: Smile! By Geraldine McCaughrean (OUP)
 0–5 years: Bartholomew and the Bug by Neal Layton (Hodder)

2003
Gold Awards
 9–11 years: The Fire-Eaters by David Almond
 6–8 years: Varjak Paw by S. F. Said, illus. Dave McKean
 0–5 years: The Witch's Children and the Queen by Ursula Jones, illus. Russell Ayto
Kids' Club Award: The Countess's Calamity by Sally Gardner

 Silver
 9–11 years: Montmorency Series by Eleanor Updale
 6–8 years: The Last Castaways by Harry Horse
 0–5 years: Tadpole's Promise by Jeanne Willis, illus. Tony Ross
 Bronze
 9–11 years: The Various by Steve Augarde
 6–8 years: The Countess's Calamity by Sally Gardner
 0–5 years: Two Frogs by Chris Wormell

2002
Gold Awards
 9–11 years: Mortal Engines by Philip Reeve (Scholastic)
 6–8 years: That Pesky Rat by Lauren Child (Orchard Books)
 0–5 years: Jazzy in the Jungle by Lucy Cousins (Walker Books)
Kids' Club Network Special Award: That Pesky Rat by Lauren Child (Orchard Books)

 Silver
 9–11 years: Cold Tom by Sally Prue (Oxford University Press)
 6–8 years: Pirate Diary by Richard Platt, illus. Chris Riddell (Walker Books)
 0–5 years: Pizza Kittens by Charlotte Voake (Walker Books)
 Bronze
 9–11 years: Stop the Train by Geraldine McCaughrean (Oxford University Press)
 6–8 years: The Last Wolf by Michael Morpurgo, illus. Michael Foreman (Doubleday)
 0–5 years: Oscar and Arabella by Neal Layton (Hodder)

2001
Gold Awards
 9–11 years: Journey to the River Sea by Eva Ibbotson (Macmillan)
 6–8 years: The Shrimp by Emily Smith (Young Corgi), illus. Wendy Smith
 0–5 years: Chimp and Zee by Catherine and Laurence Anholt (Frances Lincoln)
Kids' Club Network Special Award: What Planet Are You From Clarice Bean? by Lauren Child (Orchard Books)

 Silver
 9–11 years: The Haunting of Alaizabel Cray by Chris Wooding (Scholastic)
 6–8 years: Ug by Raymond Briggs  (by Cape)
 0–5 years: Kipper's A to Z by Mick Inkpen  (Hodder)
 Bronze
 9–11 years: The Kite Rider by Geraldine McCaughrean  (Oxford University Press)
 6–8 years: What Planet Are You From Clarice Bean? by Lauren Child  (Orchard Books)
 0–5 years: Five Little Friends by Sarah Dyer (Bloomsbury Publishing)

2000
Gold Awards
 9–11 years: The Wind Singer by William Nicholson (Mammoth)
 6–8 years: Lizzie Zipmouth by Jacqueline Wilson, illus. Nick Sharratt (Young Corgi)
 0–5 years: Max by Bob Graham (Walker Books)
Kids' Club Network Special Award: Lizzie Zipmouth by Jacqueline Wilson, illus. Nick Sharratt (Young Corgi)

 Silver
 9–11 years: The Other Side of Truth by Beverley Naidoo (Puffin)
 6–8 years: The Red and White Spotted Handkerchief by Tony Mitton, illus. Peter Bailey (Scholastic)
 0–5 years: Me and My Cat? by Satoshi Kitamura (Andersen)
 Bronze
 9–11 years: The Seeing Stone by Kevin Crossley-Holland (Orion)
 6–8 years: Beware of the Storybook Wolves by Lauren Child (Hodder)
 0–5 years: Husherbye by John Burningham (Jonathan Cape)

1999
Gold Awards
 9–11 years: Harry Potter and the Prisoner of Azkaban by J. K. Rowling (Bloomsbury Publishing)
 6–8 years: Snow White and the Seven Aliens by Laurence Anholt, illus. Arthur Robins (Orchard Books)
 0–5 years: The Gruffalo by Julia Donaldson, illus. Axel Scheffler (Macmillan)

 Silver 
 9–11 years: Kit's Wilderness by David Almond (Hodder Children's Books)
 6–8 years: Astrid, the Au Pair from Outer Space by Emily Smith (Corgi), illus. Tim Archbold
 0–5 years: Buffy - An Adventure Story by Bob Graham (Walker Books)
 Bronze
 9–11 years: Angus, Thongs and Full-Frontal Snogging by Louise Rennison (Piccadilly Press)
 6–8 years: Clarice Bean That's Me by Lauren Child (Orchard Books)
 0–5 years: I Wish I Were a Dog by Lydia Monks (Methuen)

1998
Gold Awards
 9–11 years: Harry Potter and the Chamber of Secrets by J. K. Rowling (Bloomsbury Publishing)
 6–8 years: Last of the Gold Diggers by Harry Horse (Puffin Books)
 0–5 years: Cowboy Baby by Sue Heap (Walker Books)

 Silver
 9–11 years: Aquila by Andrew Norriss (Puffin Books)
 6–8 years: The Runner by Keith Gray (Mammoth Books)
 0–5 years: Come On Daisy by Jane Simmons (Orchard Books)
 Bronze
 9–11 years: The Crowstarver by Dick King-Smith (Doubleday)
 6–8 years: The Green Ship by Quentin Blake (Jonathan Cape)
 0–5 years: Secret in the Mist by Margaret Nash (David & Charles)

1997
Gold Awards
 9–11 years: Harry Potter and the Philosopher's Stone by J. K. Rowling (Bloomsbury Publishing)
 6–8 years: The Owl Tree by Jenny Nimmo, illus. Anthony Lewis (Walker Books)
 0–5 years: Ginger by Charlotte Voake (Walker Books)

 Silver
 9–11 years: Clockwork or All Wound Up by Philip Pullman (Corgi Yearling)
 6–8 years: The Little Reindeer by Michael Foreman (Andersen Press)
 0–5 years: Leon and Bob by Simon James (Walker Books)
 Bronze
 9–11 years: Fire, Bed, and Bone by Henrietta Branford (Walker Books)
 6–8 years: We Animals Would Like a Word With You by John Agard, illus. Satoshi Kitamura (Bodley Head)
 0–5 years: Fruits by Valerie Bloom, illus. David Axtell (Macmillan)

1996
Gold Awards
 9–11 years: The Firework-Maker's Daughter by Philip Pullman, illus. Nick Harris (Corgi Yearling)
 6–8 years: The Butterfly Lion by Michael Morpurgo, illus. Christian Birmingham (Collins Children's Books)
 0–5 years: Oops! by Colin McNaughton (Andersen Press)

 Silver
 9–11 years: Johnny and the Bomb by Terry Pratchett (Doubleday)
 6–8 years: Harry the Poisonous Centipede by Lynne Reid Banks, illus. Tony Ross (Collins Children's Books)
 0–5 years: The World is Full of Babies by Mick Manning and Brita Granström (Watts Books)
 Bronze
 9–11 years: Plundering Paradise by Geraldine McCaughrean (Oxford University Press)
 6–8 years: All Because of Jackson by Dick King-Smith, illus. John Eastwood (Doubleday)
 0–5 years: Clown by Quentin Blake (Cape)

1985–1995 with Overall winners 
1995
Overall: Double Act by Jacqueline Wilson (Doubleday)
 9 – 11 years and Overall: Double Act by Jacqueline Wilson (Doubleday) (Joint Winner)
 9 – 11 years: Weather Eye by Lesley Howarth (Penguin) (Joint Winner)
 6 – 8 years: Thomas and the Tinners by Jill Paton Walsh (Macdonald Young Books)
 0 – 5 years: The Last Noo-Noo by Jill Murphy (Walker Books)

1994
Overall: ''The Exiles at Home by Hilary McKay (Gollancz) 9 – 11 years and Overall: The Exiles at Home by Hilary McKay (Gollancz)
 6 – 8 years: Dimanche Diller by Henrietta Branford, illus. Lesley Harker (Young Lions)
 0 – 5 years: So Much by Trish Cooke, illus. Helen Oxenbury (Walker Books)

1993
Overall: War Game by Michael Foreman (Pavilion) 9 – 11 years: Listen to the Dark by Maeve Henry (Heinemann)
 6 – 8 years and Overall: War Game by Michael Foreman (Pavilion)
 0 – 5 years: Hue Boy by Rita Phillips Mitchell (Gollancz)

1992
Overall: The Great Elephant Chase by Gillian Cross (Oxford University Press) 9 – 11 years and Overall: The Great Elephant Chase by Gillian Cross (Oxford University Press)
 6 – 8 years: The Story of the Creation by Jane Ray (Orchard Books)
 0 – 5 years: Nice Work, Little Wolf by Hilda Offen (Hamish Hamilton)

1991
Overall: Farmer Duck by Martin Waddell and Helen Oxenbury (Walker Books) 9 – 11 years: Krindlekrax by Philip Ridley (Cape)
 6 – 8 years: Josie Smith and Eileen by Magdalen Nabb (Collins)
 0 – 5 years and Overall: Farmer Duck by Martin Waddell and Helen Oxenbury (Walker Books)

1990
Overall: Midnight Blue by Pauline Fisk (Lion) 9 – 11 years and Overall: Midnight Blue by Pauline Fisk (Lion)
 6 – 8 years: Esio Trot by Roald Dahl, illus. Quentin Blake (Cape)
 0 – 5 years: Six-dinner Sid by Inga Moore (Simon & Schuster)

1989
Overall: We're Going on a Bear Hunt by Michael Rosen, illus. Helen Oxenbury (Walker Books) 9 – 11 years: Blitzcat by Robert Westall (Macmillan)
 6 – 8 years: Bill's New Frock by Anne Fine, illus. Philippe Dupasquier (Methuen)
 0 – 5 years and Overall: We're Going on a Bear Hunt by Michael Rosen, illus. Helen Oxenbury (Walker Books)

1988
Overall: Can't You Sleep Little Bear? by Martin Waddell and Barbara Firth (Walker Books) 9 – 11 years: Rushavenn Time by Theresa Whistler (Brixworth Primary School)
 6 – 8 years: Can it be True? by Susan Hill (Hamish Hamilton)
 0 – 5 years and Overall: Can't You Sleep Little Bear? by Martin Waddell and Barbara Firth (Walker Books)

1987
Overall: A Thief in the Village by James Berry (Hamish Hamilton) 9 – 11 years and Overall: A Thief in the Village by James Berry (Hamish Hamilton)
 6 – 8 years: Tangle and the Firesticks by Benedict Blathwayt (Julia MacRae)
 0 – 5 years: The Angel and the Soldier Boy by Peter Collington (Methuen)

1986
Overall: The Snow Spider by Jenny Nimmo (Methuen)1985
Overall: Gaffer Samson's Luck'' by Jill Paton Walsh (Kestrel)

See also
 
 Carnegie Medal
 Children's Book Council of Australia Awards
 Dorothy Canfield Fisher Children's Book Award 
 Gelett Burgess Children's Book Award
 Guardian Children's Fiction Prize
 Kate Greenaway Medal
 Newbery Medal

References 

1985 establishments in the United Kingdom
2008 disestablishments in the United Kingdom
Awards disestablished in 2008
Awards established in 1985
British children's literary awards